Pramod Bhasin stepped down as President and CEO of Genpact, India's largest  business process outsourcing (BPO) company, becoming non-executive Vice Chairman in 2011.

Career
Pramod is a British Chartered Accountant from McLintock & Co, London, and holds a Bachelor of Commerce degree from Shri Ram College of Commerce.

He became an officer of GE. His career with GE and RCA spanned 25 years across the US, Europe and Asia. He was  the head of GE Capital in India and in Asia, having earlier worked with GE Capital's Corporate and Finance Group in Stamford, Connecticut, US.

Pramod started GE Capital International Services (GECIS) in 1997 as the in-house BPO division of General Electric (GE) when he convinced the senior stakeholders at GE to outsource certain simple non-IT services to India at Gurgaon. Under Pramod GE hired Raman Roy, pioneered business process outsourcing in India, and expanded its operations from India to countries including China, Hungary, Guatemala, Poland, Mexico, Morocco, the Philippines, Romania, South Africa and the United States.

In 2007, the International Quality and Productivity Center at the Shared Services and Outsourcing Global Conclave named Genpact the Global Shared Services Leader of the Year and awarded Pramod Bhasin their Lifetime Contribution Award.

A consultant and advisor in the domain, Pramod Bhasin served as the Chairman of India's National Association of Software & Services Companies (NASSCOM) for the year 2009-10, and became a member of the Board of Trustees of NASSCOM Foundation.
He is also currently serving as President at TiE Delhi-NCR.

Pramod Bhasin appointed as chairman of ICRIER (Indian Council For Research On International Economic Relations).

Personal life
Pramod Bhasin completed his MBA from Faculty of Management Studies, Delhi University (popularly known as FMS Delhi). He completed his Indian School Certificate (ISC, equivalent to the then English GCE O Levels) at Cathedral and John Connon School, Bombay (now Mumbai), in Class of 1967.
, he lives in New Delhi.

References

Trivia and external links
India's BPO emperor - Financial Express |newspaper, 29 July 2006
Interview with Pramod on Rediff.com

Businesspeople from Delhi
Indian accountants
Living people
Delhi University alumni
Year of birth missing (living people)